An estimated 150 species of Lepidoptera, the order comprising butterflies and moths, have been recorded in the North Atlantic archipelago of the Azores.

Butterflies

Lycaenidae
Lampides boeticus (Linnaeus, 1767)

Nymphalidae
Danaus plexippus (Linnaeus, 1758)
Hipparchia azorina (Strecker, 1898)
Vanessa atalanta (Linnaeus, 1758)
Vanessa cardui (Linnaeus, 1758)

Pieridae
Colias croceus (Fourcroy, 1785)
Pieris brassicae (Linnaeus, 1758)

Moths

Argyresthiidae
Argyresthia atlanticella Rebel, 1940
Argyresthia minusculella Rebel, 1940

Autostichidae
Oegoconia novimundi (Busck, 1915)

Bedelliidae
Bedellia somnulentella (Zeller, 1847)

Blastobasidae
Blastobasis desertarum (Wollaston, 1858)
Blastobasis maroccanella Amsel, 1952

Choreutidae
Tebenna micalis (Mann, 1857)

Coleophoridae
Coleophora versurella Zeller, 1849

Cosmopterigidae
Cosmopterix pulchrimella Chambers, 1875
Pyroderces argyrogrammos (Zeller, 1847)

Crambidae
Diasemiopsis ramburialis (Duponchel, 1834)
Euchromius ocellea (Haworth, 1811)
Eudonia interlinealis (Warren, 1905)
Eudonia luteusalis (Hampson, 1907)
Eudonia melanographa (Hampson, 1907)
Herpetogramma licarsisalis (Walker, 1859)
Mecyna asinalis (Hübner, 1819)
Nomophila noctuella (Denis & Schiffermuller, 1775)
Palpita vitrealis (Rossi, 1794)
Scoparia aequipennalis Warren, 1905
Scoparia carvalhoi Nuss, Karsholt & Meyer, 1998
Scoparia coecimaculalis Warren, 1905
Scoparia semiamplalis Warren, 1905
Spoladea recurvalis (Fabricius, 1775)
Udea azorensis Meyer, Nuss & Speidel, 1997
Udea ferrugalis (Hübner, 1796)

Epermeniidae
Epermenia aequidentellus (E. Hofmann, 1867)

Erebidae
Eublemma ostrina (Hübner, 1808)
Hypena lividalis (Hübner, 1796)
Hypena obsitalis (Hübner, 1813)
Ophiusa tirhaca (Cramer, 1773)
Schrankia costaestrigalis (Stephens, 1834)
Tathorhynchus exsiccata (Lederer, 1855)
Utetheisa pulchella (Linnaeus, 1758)

Gelechiidae
Aproaerema anthyllidella (Hübner, 1813)
Brachmia infuscatella Rebel, 1940
Chrysoesthia sexguttella (Thunberg, 1794)
Phthorimaea operculella (Zeller, 1873)
Platyedra subcinerea (Haworth, 1828)
Sitotroga cerealella (Olivier, 1789)

Geometridae
Ascotis fortunata (Blachier, 1887)
Costaconvexa centrostrigaria (Wollaston, 1858)
Cyclophora azorensis (Prout, 1920)
Cyclophora puppillaria (Hübner, 1799)
Eupithecia ogilviata (Warren, 1905)
Gymnoscelis rufifasciata (Haworth, 1809)
Nycterosea obstipata (Fabricius, 1794)
Rhodometra sacraria (Linnaeus, 1767)
Xanthorhoe inaequata Warren, 1905

Glyphipterigidae
Glyphipterix diaphora Walsingham, 1894

Gracillariidae
Caloptilia coruscans (Walsingham, 1907)
Dialectica scalariella (Zeller, 1850)
Micrurapteryx bistrigella (Rebel, 1940)
Phyllocnistis citrella Stainton, 1856
Phyllonorycter messaniella (Zeller, 1846)

Nepticulidae
Stigmella aurella (Fabricius, 1775)

Noctuidae
Agrotis ipsilon (Hufnagel, 1766)
Agrotis segetum (Denis & Schiffermuller, 1775)
Anarta trifolii (Hufnagel, 1766)
Autographa gamma (Linnaeus, 1758)
Chrysodeixis chalcites (Esper, 1789)
Ctenoplusia limbirena (Guenee, 1852)
Euplexia lucipara (Linnaeus, 1758)
Galgula partita Guenee, 1852
Hadena azorica Meyer & Fibiger, 2002
Helicoverpa armigera (Hübner, 1808)
Leucania loreyi (Duponchel, 1827)
Melanchra granti Warren, 1905
Mesapamea storai (Rebel, 1940)
Mythimna unipuncta (Haworth, 1809)
Noctua atlantica (Warren, 1905)
Noctua carvalhoi (Pinker, 1983)
Noctua pronuba (Linnaeus, 1758)
Paranataelia whitei (Rebel, 1906)
Peridroma saucia (Hübner, 1808)
Phlogophora cabrali Pinker, 1971
Phlogophora furnasi Pinker, 1971
Phlogophora interrupta (Warren, 1905)
Phlogophora kruegeri Saldaitis & Ivinskis, 2006
Phlogophora meticulosa (Linnaeus, 1758)
Sesamia nonagrioides Lefebvre, 1827
Spodoptera exigua (Hübner, 1808)
Spodoptera littoralis (Boisduval, 1833)
Thysanoplusia orichalcea (Fabricius, 1775)
Trichoplusia ni (Hübner, 1803)
Xestia c-nigrum (Linnaeus, 1758)

Plutellidae
Plutella xylostella (Linnaeus, 1758)

Praydidae
Prays citri (Milliere, 1873)
Prays oleae (Bernard, 1788)
Luffia ferchaultella (Stephens, 1850)

Pterophoridae
Amblyptilia acanthadactyla (Hübner, 1813)
Emmelina monodactyla (Linnaeus, 1758)
Lantanophaga pusillidactylus (Walker, 1864)
Stenoptilia meyeri Gielis, 1997
Stenoptilia zophodactylus (Duponchel, 1840)

Pyralidae
Aglossa caprealis (Hübner, 1809)
Apomyelois ceratoniae (Zeller, 1839)
Cadra cautella (Walker, 1863)
Corcyra cephalonica (Stainton, 1866)
Cryptoblabes gnidiella (Milliere, 1867)
Ephestia elutella (Hübner, 1796)
Ephestia kuehniella Zeller, 1879
Galleria mellonella (Linnaeus, 1758)
Homoeosoma miguelensis Meyer, Nuss & Speidel, 1997
Homoeosoma picoensis Meyer, Nuss & Speidel, 1997
Phycitodes albatella (Ragonot, 1887)
Plodia interpunctella (Hübner, 1813)
Pyralis farinalis (Linnaeus, 1758)

Sphingidae
Acherontia atropos (Linnaeus, 1758)
Agrius convolvuli (Linnaeus, 1758)
Hippotion celerio (Linnaeus, 1758)
Macroglossum stellatarum (Linnaeus, 1758)

Stathmopodidae
Neomariania incertella (Rebel, 1940)
Neomariania oecophorella (Rebel, 1940)
Neomariania scriptella (Rebel, 1940)

Tineidae
Eudarcia atlantica Henderickx, 1995
Monopis crocicapitella (Clemens, 1859)
Niditinea fuscella (Linnaeus, 1758)
Oinophila v-flava (Haworth, 1828)
Opogona omoscopa (Meyrick, 1893)
Opogona sacchari (Bojer, 1856)
Praeacedes atomosella (Walker, 1863)
Tenaga nigripunctella (Haworth, 1828)
Tinea murariella Staudinger, 1859
Tinea poecilella Rebel, 1940
Trichophaga bipartitella (Ragonot, 1892)
Trichophaga tapetzella (Linnaeus, 1758)

Tortricidae
Acleris schalleriana (Linnaeus, 1761)
Acleris variegana (Denis & Schiffermuller, 1775)
Bactra lancealana (Hübner, 1799)
Bactra venosana (Zeller, 1847)
Clavigesta sylvestrana (Curtis, 1850)
Crocidosema plebejana Zeller, 1847
Cydia pomonella (Linnaeus, 1758)
Cydia splendana (Hübner, 1799)
Endothenia oblongana (Haworth, 1811)
Epiphyas postvittana (Walker, 1863)
Grapholita molesta (Busck, 1916)
Pandemis heparana (Denis & Schiffermuller, 1775)
Rhopobota naevana (Hübner, 1817)
Selania leplastriana (Curtis, 1831)

External links
Fauna Europaea
Checklist of the Noctuidae of Azores

Azores
Azores
Moths
Butterflies